Jonathan Carney is an American violinist, violist, and conductor.  Carney studied at the Juilliard School with Christine Dethier and Ivan Galamian. He is the concertmaster of the Baltimore Symphony Orchestra.

Career 
Carney moved to London on a Leverhulme Fellowship Award to study at the Royal College of Music with Trevor Williams.

Carney grew up in Tenafly, New Jersey and graduated from Tenafly High School.

References

External links
 

20th-century American conductors (music)
20th-century American male musicians
21st-century American conductors (music)
21st-century American male musicians
21st-century American violinists
Alumni of the Royal College of Music
American male conductors (music)
Juilliard School alumni
Living people
Male violinists
People from Tenafly, New Jersey
Tenafly High School alumni
Year of birth missing (living people)